The arrondissement of Montbrison is located in the Loire department in the Auvergne-Rhône-Alpes region of France. It has 135 communes.

Composition

The communes of the arrondissement of Montbrison, and their INSEE codes, are:

 Aboën (42001)
 Ailleux (42002)
 Apinac (42006)
 Arthun (42009)
 Aveizieux (42010)
 Bard (42012)
 Bellegarde-en-Forez (42013)
 Boën-sur-Lignon (42019)
 Boisset-lès-Montrond (42020)
 Boisset-Saint-Priest (42021)
 Bonson (42022)
 Bussy-Albieux (42030)
 Cervières (42034)
 Cezay (42035)
 Chalain-d'Uzore (42037)
 Chalain-le-Comtal (42038)
 Chalmazel-Jeansagnière (42039)
 La Chamba (42040)
 Chambéon (42041)
 Chambles (42042)
 Chambœuf (42043)
 La Chambonie (42045)
 Champdieu (42046)
 La Chapelle-en-Lafaye (42050)
 Châtelneuf (42054)
 Châtelus (42055)
 Chazelles-sur-Lavieu (42058)
 Chazelles-sur-Lyon (42059)
 Chenereilles (42060)
 Chevrières (42062)
 Civens (42065)
 Cleppé (42066)
 La Côte-en-Couzan (42072)
 Cottance (42073)
 Craintilleux (42075)
 Cuzieu (42081)
 Débats-Rivière-d'Orpra (42084)
 Écotay-l'Olme (42087)
 Épercieux-Saint-Paul (42088)
 Essertines-en-Châtelneuf (42089)
 Essertines-en-Donzy (42090)
 Estivareilles (42091)
 Feurs (42094)
 La Gimond (42100)
 Grammond (42102)
 Grézieux-le-Fromental (42105)
 Gumières (42107)
 L'Hôpital-le-Grand (42108)
 L'Hôpital-sous-Rochefort (42109)
 Jas (42113)
 Lavieu (42117)
 Leigneux (42119)
 Lérigneux (42121)
 Lézigneux (42122)
 Luriecq (42126)
 Magneux-Haute-Rive (42130)
 Marcilly-le-Châtel (42134)
 Marclopt (42135)
 Marcoux (42136)
 Margerie-Chantagret (42137)
 Maringes (42138)
 Marols (42140)
 Merle-Leignec (42142)
 Mizérieux (42143)
 Montarcher (42146)
 Montbrison (42147)
 Montchal (42148)
 Montrond-les-Bains (42149)
 Montverdun (42150)
 Mornand-en-Forez (42151)
 Nervieux (42155)
 Noirétable (42159)
 Palogneux (42164)
 Panissières (42165)
 Périgneux (42169)
 Poncins (42174)
 Pouilly-lès-Feurs (42175)
 Pralong (42179)
 Précieux (42180)
 Rivas (42185)
 Roche (42188)
 Rozier-Côtes-d'Aurec (42192)
 Rozier-en-Donzy (42193)
 Sail-sous-Couzan (42195)
 Saint-André-le-Puy (42200)
 Saint-Barthélemy-Lestra (42202)
 Saint-Bonnet-le-Château (42204)
 Saint-Bonnet-le-Courreau (42205)
 Saint-Bonnet-les-Oules (42206)
 Saint-Cyprien (42211)
 Saint-Cyr-les-Vignes (42214)
 Saint-Denis-sur-Coise (42216)
 Saint-Didier-sur-Rochefort (42217)
 Sainte-Agathe-la-Bouteresse (42197)
 Sainte-Foy-Saint-Sulpice (42221)
 Saint-Étienne-le-Molard (42219)
 Saint-Galmier (42222)
 Saint-Georges-en-Couzan (42227)
 Saint-Georges-Haute-Ville (42228)
 Saint-Hilaire-Cusson-la-Valmitte (42235)
 Saint-Jean-la-Vêtre (42238)
 Saint-Jean-Soleymieux (42240)
 Saint-Just-en-Bas (42247)
 Saint-Just-Saint-Rambert (42279)
 Saint-Laurent-la-Conche (42251)
 Saint-Laurent-Rochefort (42252)
 Saint-Marcellin-en-Forez (42256)
 Saint-Martin-Lestra (42261)
 Saint-Maurice-en-Gourgois (42262)
 Saint-Médard-en-Forez (42264)
 Saint-Nizier-de-Fornas (42266)
 Saint-Paul-d'Uzore (42269)
 Saint-Priest-la-Vêtre (42278)
 Saint-Romain-le-Puy (42285)
 Saint-Sixte (42288)
 Saint-Thomas-la-Garde (42290)
 Les Salles (42295)
 Salt-en-Donzy (42296)
 Salvizinet (42297)
 Sauvain (42298)
 Savigneux (42299)
 Soleymieux (42301)
 Sury-le-Comtal (42304)
 La Tourette (42312)
 Trelins (42313)
 Unias (42315)
 Usson-en-Forez (42318)
 Valeille (42319)
 La Valla-sur-Rochefort (42321)
 Veauche (42323)
 Veauchette (42324)
 Verrières-en-Forez (42328)
 Vêtre-sur-Anzon (42245)
 Viricelles (42335)
 Virigneux (42336)

History

The arrondissement of Montbrison was created in 1800. In January 2017 it lost the commune Andrézieux-Bouthéon to the arrondissement of Saint-Étienne.

As a result of the reorganisation of the cantons of France which came into effect in 2015, the borders of the cantons are no longer related to the borders of the arrondissements. The cantons of the arrondissement of Montbrison were, as of January 2015:

 Boën-sur-Lignon
 Chazelles-sur-Lyon
 Feurs
 Montbrison
 Noirétable
 Saint-Bonnet-le-Château
 Saint-Galmier
 Saint-Georges-en-Couzan
 Saint-Jean-Soleymieux
 Saint-Just-Saint-Rambert

References

Montbrison